Pseudocumatidae is a family of crustaceans of the order Cumacea. Its members have a small, free telson. The uropods bear endopods (interior branch) on one segment. The males have two pairs of rather rudimentary pleopods and the flagella of the second antenna reach far beyond the pereon. In females the second antenna is much smaller than the first antenna.

References

External links 

Cumacea
Crustacean families